Katelyn Nacon is an American actress who played Elisia Brown in the go90 web series Tagged (2016–2018) and Enid on The Walking Dead (2015–2019), She also stars in Linoleum (2022) and Southern Gospel  (2023).

Personal life
Nacon attended Woodstock High School, in Woodstock, Georgia.

Career
Nacon began her acting career with a role in the film Loving Generously. Her first television appearance was on Resurrection. She appeared on Adult Swim's Too Many Cooks, an episode that went viral on YouTube. She portrays Elisia on T@gged.  Her most notable role is Enid on The Walking Dead where she was a main character in season 9.

In 2015, Nacon released her first EP Love in May.

Filmography

Awards and nominations

References

External links

 

Living people
American television actresses
American film actresses
21st-century American actresses
American web series actresses
Year of birth missing (living people)